Kathleen Tallarita (born May 2, 1965) is an American politician who served in the Connecticut House of Representatives from 1999 to 2013, representing the 58th district.

References

1965 births
Living people
Democratic Party members of the Connecticut House of Representatives